The women's heptathlon event at the 1992 World Junior Championships in Athletics was held in Seoul, Korea, at Olympic Stadium on 18 and 19 September.

Medalists

Results

Final
18/19 September

Participation
According to an unofficial count, 17 athletes from 13 countries participated in the event.

References

Heptathlon
Combined events at the World Athletics U20 Championships